Alvin Olin King (June 21, 1890 – February 21, 1958) was an American politician allied with the Democratic faction of Governor Huey Pierce Long Jr. A state senator, he was President Pro Tempore in 1931, after Long had been elected in 1930 as a US Senator.

After Long had conflict with his lieutenant governor, who was ruled to have resigned, King advanced to serve as lieutenant governor for a year. Beginning in late January 1932, he served for three and a half months as governor of Louisiana, after Long had resigned and moved to Washington, DC.

Early life and education
King was born in Leoti in Wichita County in western Kansas – not to be confused with the city of Wichita in southern Kansas. He attended Tulane University Law School in New Orleans and began the practice of law in Calcasieu Parish, Louisiana.

Political career
King had joined the Democratic Party and was elected to the Louisiana State Senate from Calcasieu Parish in the southwestern part of the state. He rose to President Pro Tempore of that body.

In 1930 Huey Long, then serving as governor, was elected from Louisiana to the United States Senate. In 1931 Dr. Paul Narcisse Cyr of Jeanerette, a physician and lieutenant governor, filed an ouster suit against Long, under "a law prohibiting dual office holding." He also attempted to take the oath of office as governor at the time when Long would normally have been expected to have vacated the position. The two men had been bitter foes since early years in office.

But Long had not resigned from the governorship, as he had some work he wanted to complete before leaving for Washington, D.C. and being sworn in as senator. The State Supreme Court rejected Cyr's suit. Long won a favorable court ruling that Cyr had given up the position of lieutenant governor by his actions.

King, as President Pro Tempore, assumed the office according to the succession plan, to fill out the term. King succeeded Cyr as Lieutenant Governor in 1931. Cyr filed an ouster suit against King, but it was rejected by the State Supreme Court. Cyr ended his political career at that point and returned to his life in Iberia Parish.

After Long finally resigned in January 1932, King assumed the governorship, serving for the three and a half months remaining in 1932 in Long's elected term, from January 25, 1932 to May 10, 1932.

During his brief tenure, King called for a reduction in highway spending, since the Great Depression made it difficult to finance bonds at an acceptable rate. The Huey P. Long Bridge in Jefferson Parish was under construction in this period, and completed under the next elected governor, Oscar K. Allen. Signs above the roadway entrance to the bridge say only that it was built during the administrations of Huey Long and Oscar K. Allen.

Later years
After his several months as governor, King did not run for office again. He returned to practicing law and served for a time as president of the Louisiana Bar Association. He was a Methodist. He died in his home city of Lake Charles.

References

"Alvin Olin King 1932", State of Louisiana - Biography.

External links
Cemetery Memorial by La-Cemeteries

1890 births
1958 deaths
People from Wichita County, Kansas
Tulane University alumni
Methodists from Louisiana
Politicians from Lake Charles, Louisiana
Louisiana lawyers
Democratic Party Louisiana state senators
Democratic Party governors of Louisiana
Tulane University Law School alumni
20th-century American politicians